Dudley William Mason GC (7 October 1901 – 26 April 1987) was master of the tanker SS Ohio during the Second World War. He commanded the tanker during Operation Pedestal, a convoy to relieve Malta. He was awarded the George Cross for this operation.

Early life

Dudley Mason was born into a family in Surbiton. His father was a chauffeur. Mason went to school in Long Ditton before going to sea as an apprentice at 17 in June 1920.

George Cross action

In August 1942, the Ohio, a 14,000-ton tanker belonging to the Texas Oil Company on loan to the British Ministry of War Transport, was one of 14 merchant vessels sent to aid Malta. The convoy, with naval and air escort, met enemy action on 11 August. The next day, when air attacks began, it became apparent the tanker was the main target. For four days the ship suffered continuous attacks from aircraft and submarines. She sustained grave damage from a torpedo, two sticks of bombs lifted her out of the water and another exploded in her boiler room. A Stuka crashed and exploded on her deck, her back was broken and Ohio was twice abandoned and reboarded. In spite of this she reached Malta on 15 August and was carried into Valletta harbour, lashed between the destroyers HMS Ledbury and HMS Penn, and not until the last of the fuel had been pumped out did Ohio settle on the bottom. Captain Mason's GC was not only for his personal courage and determination but for his crew. Other gallantry awards to the crew of Ohio during Operation Pedestal included a Distinguished Service Order, five Distinguished Service Crosses and seven Distinguished Service Medals.

Citation

The KING has been graciously pleased to award the GEORGE CROSS to Captain Dudley William Mason, Master, SS Ohio. During the passage to Malta of an important convoy Captain Mason's ship suffered most violent onslaught. She was a focus of attack throughout and was torpedoed early one night. Although gravely damaged, her engines were kept going and the Master made a magnificent passage by hand-steering and without a compass. The ship's gunners helped to bring down one of the attacking aircraft. The vessel was hit again before morning, but though she did not sink, her engine room was wrecked. She was then towed. The unwieldy condition of the vessel and persistent enemy attacks made progress slow, and it was uncertain whether she would remain afloat. All next day progress somehow continued and the ship reached Malta after a further night at sea. The violence of the enemy could not deter the Master from his purpose. Throughout he showed skill and courage of the highest order and it was due to his determination that, in spite of the most persistent enemy opposition, the vessel, with her valuable cargo, eventually reached Malta and was safely berthed. (The award is dated 4th September, 1942.)

The London Gazette, 8 September 1942

References

External links
Treasures webpage of the Honourable Company of Master Mariners who hold Mason's GC aboard HQS Wellington
T 350/2, catalogue details for the official file detailing the award of the GC to Mason, held by The National Archives

British recipients of the George Cross
British Merchant Navy officers
People from Surbiton
1901 births
1987 deaths
British Merchant Navy personnel of World War II